Ladakh Autonomous Hill Development Council may refer to:

 Ladakh Autonomous Hill Development Council, Kargil
 Ladakh Autonomous Hill Development Council, Leh